This is a list of video games for the Nintendo 3DS released physically on Nintendo 3DS game cards and/or digitally on the Nintendo eShop.

Games 
The Nintendo 3DS portable system has a large library of games, which are released in game card and/or digital form. Numerous titles of games here are subject to change. This list does not include downloadable games available via the Virtual Console service or downloadable games released as part of the 3D Classics series. The Nintendo 3DS family is backward compatible with its predecessor, the Nintendo DS line, and its software, including most DSi software.
The list is initially organized alphabetically by their English titles or their alphabet conversions, but it is also possible to sort each column individually by clicking the square icon at the top of each column. The Nintendo 3DS system is region locked, meaning that in reality each system has a restricted library of games to select from, depending on the region of the device; the list below displays the availability of games within each of the four regions.

For a chronological list, click the sort button in any of the available regions' column. Games dated February 26, 2011, (Japan), March 25, 2011, (Europe), March 27, 2011, (North America), and March 31, 2011, (Australia) are the launch titles of each respective region.

There are  games on this list.

Applications

Bundles

See also 
 3D Classics
 List of DSiWare games and applications
 List of Nintendo DS games
 List of Nintendo Network games
 List of Nintendo Switch games
 List of Virtual Console games for Nintendo 3DS (Japan)
 List of Virtual Console games for Nintendo 3DS (North America)
 List of Virtual Console games for Nintendo 3DS (PAL region)
 List of Wii U games

Notes

References

External links 
 

 
3DS games
Video game lists by platform
2010s in video gaming